Balellidae is a family of cnidarians belonging to the order Anthoathecata.

Genera:
 Balella Stechow, 1919

References

Filifera
Cnidarian families